Agustín Antolínez, O.S.A. (6 December 1554 – 19 June 1626) was a Roman Catholic prelate who served as Archbishop of Santiago de Compostela (1624–1626) and Bishop of Ciudad Rodrigo (1623–1624).

Biography
Agustín Antolínez was born in Valladolid, Spain and ordained a priest in the Order of Saint Augustine. On 10 May 1623, he was appointed during the papacy of Pope Gregory XV as Bishop of Ciudad Rodrigo. On 24 August 1623, he was consecrated bishop by Luis Fernández de Córdoba, Archbishop of Santiago de Compostela, with Juan Bravo Lagunas, Bishop of Ugento, and Antonio de Gouvea, Titular Bishop of Cyrene, serving as co-consecrators. On 1 July 1624, he was appointed during the papacy of Pope Urban VIII as Archbishop of Santiago de Compostela. He served as Archbishop of Santiago de Compostela until his death on 19 June 1626.

Writings and bibliography

Lazcano, Rafael, Tesauro Agustiniano. 2: Álvarez de Toledo - Asensio Aguirre, p. 183-196.

References

External links and additional sources
 (for Chronology of Bishops) 
 (for Chronology of Bishops) 
 (for Chronology of Bishops) 
 (for Chronology of Bishops) 

17th-century Roman Catholic archbishops in Spain
1554 births
1626 deaths
People from Valladolid
Bishops appointed by Pope Gregory XV
Bishops appointed by Pope Urban VIII
Augustinian bishops
16th-century Spanish Roman Catholic theologians
17th-century Spanish Roman Catholic theologians